The 2010 Bristol City Council elections were held on Thursday 6 May 2010, for 23 seats, that being one third of the total number of councillors. The Liberal Democrats, who had won overall control of the council in 2009, increased their majority to six seats.

The Liberal Democrats were defending 9 seats, the Labour Party 4 and the Conservatives 8.

The party standings following the election:

Ward results

Avonmouth

Bedminster

Bishopston

Bishopsworth

Brislington East

Brislington West

Filwood

Hartcliffe

Henbury

Hengrove

Henleaze

Horfield

Kingsweston

Knowle

Lockleaze

Redland

Southmead

Southville

Stockwood

Stoke Bishop

Westbury-on-Trym

Whitchurch Park

Windmill Hill

See also
 Politics of Bristol
 2010 United Kingdom local elections

References
Wards up for election in 2010

2010 English local elections
May 2010 events in the United Kingdom
2010
2010s in Bristol